The House of Obrenović (Obrenovići / Обреновићи) was a Serbian dynasty that ruled Serbia from 1815 to 1842, and again from 1858 to 1903. They came to power through the leadership of their progenitor Miloš Obrenović I in the Serbian Uprising of 1815–1817 against the Ottoman Empire, which led to the formation of the Principality of Serbia in 1817. The Obrenović dynasty were traditionally allied with Austria-Hungary and opposed the Russian-supported Karađorđević dynasty.

The family's rule came to an end in a coup d’état by the military conspirators, often known today as the Black Hand, who invaded the royal palace and murdered King Alexander I, who died without an heir. The National Assembly of Serbia invited Peter Karađorđević to become king of Serbia. After the breakup of Yugoslavia, some descendants from Jakov Obrenović, Miloš Obrenović's half-brother, declared themselves successors of the Royal House of Obrenović and elected their pretender to the defunct throne of Serbia.

Unlike other Balkan states such as Greece, Bulgaria, or Romania, Serbia did not import a member of an existing European royal family (mostly German dynasties) to take its throne; the Obrenović dynasty, like its Karađorđević rival, was an indigenous Serbian family.

List of monarchs

Unlike most other dynasties in Europe, where a regnal number is used to distinguish different monarchs who shared the same given name, the Obrenović dynasty assigned subsequent regnal numbers to each ruling prince. Thus, there was never a Milan I, Milan III, a Mihailo I or a Mihailo II. Milan II and Mihailo III were simply the second and third ruling prince from the Obrenović dynasty. This practice was discontinued when prince Milan Obrenovic IV  proclaimed himself king and declared the principality of Serbia a kingdom (1882).

Male descendants of Baba Višnja

 Baba Višnja (1737–1817)
Jakov Obrenović (1767–1811)
Archimandrite Samuil Jakovljević (N/a)
Petar Jakovljević (N/a–1817)
Đorđe Jakovljević (1799–1849)
Grujica Jakovljević (1820–1870)
Miloje Jakovljević (1826–1888)
Antonio Jakovljević (1847–1880)
Marko Jakovljević (1852–1924)
Stanimir Jakovljević (1904–1976)
Radoslav Jakovljević (1941–1996)
Predrag Obrenović Jakovljević (born 1970)
Jakov Jakovljević
General Milan Obrenović (1770–1810)
 Prince Miloš I (1783–1860)
 Prince Milan II (1819–1839)
 Prince Michael III (1823–1868)
(illegit.) Velimir Mihailo Teodorović (1849–1898) 
Prince Todor (N/a)
Prince Gabriel (N/a)
General Jovan Obrenović (1786–1850)
Obren Obrenović (1818–1826)
Prince Jevrem (1790–1856)
Miloš Obrenović (1829–1861)
 King Milan I (1854–1901)
 King Alexander I (1876–1903)
Prince Sergei (1878–1878)
(illegit.) George Obrenović (1890–1925)
Stefan Obrenović (N/a)
Panta Obrenović (1945–2002)

Other family members
Princess Anka Obrenović, daughter of Prince Jevrem Obrenović
Katarina Konstantinović, daughter of Princess Anka Obrenović and mistress of her cousin, Prince Michael III of Serbia
Natalia Konstantinović, granddaughter of Princess Anka Obrenović
Elena Maria Catargiu-Obrenović, mother of King Milan I of Serbia
Queen Natalie of Serbia, wife of King Milan I of Serbia
Queen Draga of Serbia, wife of King Alexander I of Serbia and former lady-in-waiting to his mother

See also
List of Serbian monarchs

References

External links

 The Royal House of Obrenović

 
Modern history of Serbia
19th century in Serbia
20th century in Serbia
1817 establishments in Serbia
1842 disestablishments in Serbia
1858 establishments in Serbia
1903 disestablishments in Serbia